The  was an early 1940s light transport monoplane built by Nippon Kokusai Koku Kogyo K.K for the Imperial Japanese Army as a development of the Teradako-ken TK-3 which had first flown in 1938.

Development
The Teradako-ken TK-3 was a prototype eight-to-ten passenger light transport monoplane built by Nippon Koku Kogyo Kabushiki Kaisha as a short-range transport for civil use at the request of Imperial Japanese Airways to replace its aging fleet of Airspeed Envoys and Fokker Super Universals. The first of two prototypes flew in June 1938, but was unable to meet the required performance requirements and the project was cancelled. In 1939, the Imperial Japanese Army revived the project to meet its urgent requirement for a light transport and liaison aircraft and instructed Nippon to develop the design as the Ki-59.

The Ki-59 was a high-wing cantilever monoplane with a fixed tailwheel landing gear and conventional single vertical tail surfaces. It was powered by two 450 hp (336 kW) Hitachi Ha-13a radial engines and other modifications to the design were made to meet Army requirements. The Ki-59 was ordered into production in 1941 with the designation Army Type 1 Transport, and an additional 59 units were produced. After the start of World War II, the aircraft was given the Allied reporting name Theresa. Despite the more powerful engines and modifications sponsored by the Japanese Army, the Ki-59 remained a poor performer and saw little service before being replaced by the more capable Tachikawa Ki-54. A small number were transferred to Manchukuo National Airways.

Near the end of 1941 one Ki-59 was modified into a glider with the removal of the engines and the landing gear replaced by underfuselage skids. It was designated the Ku-8-I or Army Experimental Glider. This was further developed as the Ku-8-II or Army Type 4 Large Transport Glider which became the only operationally-used Japanese assault glider. It was named 'Gander' by the Allies.

Variants
 TK-3  Prototype civil transport with two 640 hp (477 kW) Nakajima Kotobuki 3 radial engines, two built.
 Ki-59 (Army Type 1 Transport) ("Theresa")  Production military transport with two 450 hp (336 kW) Hitachi Ha-13a radial engines, 59 built.
 Ku-8-I (Army Experimental Glider)  Experimental conversion to glider configuration.
 Ku-8-II (Army Type 4 Large Transport Glider) ("Gander")  Assault-glider variant.

Operators

 Imperial Japanese Army Air Force

 Manchukuo National Airways

Specifications (Ki-59)

See also

References

Notes

Bibliography

 
 
 

Ki-59
Ki-059, Kokusai
High-wing aircraft
Aircraft first flown in 1941
Twin piston-engined tractor aircraft